Deusdedit or Deodatus (literally "God has given") is the name of several ecclesiastical figures of the Middle Ages:

Pope Deusdedit or Pope Adeodatus I (died 618)
Deusdedit of Canterbury (died 664) 
Deodatus of Nevers or Deodatus of Jointures (died )
Deusdedit of San Pietro in Vincoli (fl. 11th century), cardinal and canon lawyer
Deusdedit of San Lorenzo in Damaso (fl. 12th century), cardinal and papal legate
Teodato Ipato or Deusdedit, Doge of Venice 742-751
Deodatus of Nola, a saint in the 5th century
Deodatus of Blois, a saint in the 6th century
 (998–1017), a bishop of Prague

See also
Adeodatus (disambiguation)
Deodat
Theodore (disambiguation)
Dorotheus (disambiguation)
Dieudonné (disambiguation)